Tamriko Salukvadze (born 9 February 1991) is a Georgian footballer who plays as a midfielder and has appeared for the Georgia women's national team.

Career
Salukvadze has been capped for the Georgia national team, appearing for the team during the UEFA Women's Euro 2021 qualifying cycle.

International goals

References

External links
 
 

1991 births
Living people
Women's footballers from Georgia (country)
Georgia (country) women's international footballers
Women's association football midfielders